Charaxes paphianus, the falcate red charaxes, is a butterfly in the family Nymphalidae. It is found in Sierra Leone, Guinea, Liberia, Ivory Coast, Ghana, Togo, Nigeria, Cameroon, Gabon, the Republic of the Congo, the Central African Republic, Angola, the Democratic Republic of the Congo, Uganda, Sudan and Kenya. 
The habitat consists of primary lowland evergreen forests.

The larvae feed on Acacia species, including A. brevispica.

Short description
Forewing with concave edge and sharp point and reddish-brown-yellow ground colour. The termen black edged with a width of 2–4 mm black; two black costal marks and some black discal flecks. The cross line of the underside forewing bent. Underside paler with a cross line separating a paler inner area from a less pale outer area; almost everywhere with grey satin.

Subspecies
Charaxes paphianus paphianus (Nigeria, Cameroon, Gabon, Congo, Central African Republic, northern Angola, Democratic Republic of the Congo)
Charaxes paphianus falcata (Butler, 1872) (Sierra Leone, Guinea, Liberia, Ivory Coast, Ghana, Togo, Nigeria, western Cameroon)
Charaxes paphianus subpallida Joicey & Talbot, 1925  (north-eastern Democratic Republic of the Congo, southern Sudan, Uganda, western Kenya)

Taxonomy
Charaxes pleione is a member of the species group Charaxes paphianus. 
The supposed clade members are:

Charaxes paphianus, nominate
Charaxes pleione

Realm
Afrotropical realm

References

External links
Images of C.paphianus subpallida Royal Museum for Central Africa (Albertine Rift Project)
Charaxes paphianus paphianus images at Consortium for the Barcode of Life
Charaxes paphianus falcata images at BOLD
Charaxes paphianus subpallida images at BOLD includes verso
Pteron Images
Victor Gurney Logan Van Someren, 1974 Revisional notes on African Charaxes (Lepidoptera: Nymphalidae). Part IX. Bulletin of the British Museum of Natural History (Entomology) 29 (8):415-487. 
Seitz, A. Die Gross-Schmetterlinge der Erde 13: Die Afrikanischen Tagfalter. Plate XIII 32

Butterflies described in 1871
paphianus
Butterflies of Africa
Taxa named by Christopher Ward (entomologist)